Sak Lek is a district (amphoe) in the northeastern part of Phichit province, central Thailand.

Geography
Neighboring districts are (from the south clockwise) Wang Sai Phun and Mueang Phichit of Phichit Province, Bang Krathum, Wang Thong and Noen Maprang of Phitsanulok province.

History
The minor district was established on 1 April 1995 by splitting of the tambon Sak Lek, Tha Yiam, and Khlong Sai of Mueang Phichit district.

The Thai government on 15 May 2007, upgraded all 81 minor districts to full districts. With publication in the Royal Gazette on 24 August, the upgrade became official.

Its name "Sak Lek" directly translates as "steel pestle" since in the past a pestle cargo ship sank here. Hence, the name Sak Lek since then.

Economy
Sak Lek is the largest plantation of mayong chit (mango plum) in Thailand, especially at Wang Thap Sai Subdistrict with an area of approximately 2,000 rais (790.51 acres).

Administration
The district is divided into five sub-districts (tambon), which are further subdivided into 44 villages (muban). The township (thesaban tambon) Sak Lek covers parts of the tambon Sak Lek. There are a further five tambon administrative organizations (TAO).

References

External links
amphoe.com

Sak Lek